The Barbara Hepworth Museum and Sculpture Garden in St Ives, Cornwall preserves the 20th-century sculptor Barbara Hepworth's studio and garden much as they were when she lived and worked there. She purchased the site in 1949 and lived and worked there for 26 years until her death in a fire on the premises in 1975.

History

The studio, known as Trewyn Studio, was purchased by Barbara Hepworth in 1949, and is typical of the stone-built houses in St Ives. Her living room is furnished as she left it, while the workshop remains full of her tools and equipment, materials, and part-worked pieces. The museum was opened by her family in 1976, after Barbara had left instructions to this effect in her will. It is the largest collection of her works that are on permanent display.

The sculptures featured at the museum (mainly in the secluded garden) were some of her favourites. Her workshop also includes a queue of uncut stones that one visitor has described as "still waiting for their moment in the shadow of her workshop". In 1950 she acquired two huge blocks of Galway limestone which she carved into her Festival of Britain commission, the Contrapuntal Forms. A set of photographs in the museum shows the progress of this project. Wood carving was done in an upstairs room, and the bronze statues she started casting in 1956 had their origins in the plaster prototypes she worked on in the upper of the two outside studios.

She was helped in the creation of the garden by her friend, the South African-born composer Priaulx Rainier.

Barbara Hepworth died in a fire at this site in 1975, which was caused by one of her cigarettes making some package burn, when she was aged 72.

The family passed the museum to the Tate gallery in 1980 and they still manage it.

Books

 The Barbara Hepworth Sculpture Garden by Miranda Phillips and Chris Stephens. Tate Publishing, 2002. .

See also

 The Hepworth Wakefield
 St Ives artists
 Tate St Ives
 List of single-artist museums

References

External links

 Barbara Hepworth Museum and Sculpture Garden  Visiting information, events information, works on display (Tate Online)
 artcornwall.org online journal for art and artists in Cornwall

 

Hepworth Museum
Hepworth Museum
Houses in Cornwall
Museums in Cornwall
Hepworth Museum
Sculpture galleries in the United Kingdom
Sculpture gardens, trails and parks in the United Kingdom
Women's museums in the United Kingdom
Gardens in Cornwall
Hepworth, Barbara
Artists' studios in the United Kingdom